Metakha Gewog (Dzongkha: སྨད་བཏབ་ཁ་,Metabkha Gewog) is a gewog (village block) of Chukha District, Bhutan. The gewog has an area of 100 square kilometres and contains six villages.

References

Gewogs of Bhutan
Chukha District